Xylorhiza adusta is a species of beetles in the longhorn beetle family (Cerambycidae).

Description
The background color of this mimetic bark-like long-horned borer is greyish-brown, with dark brown longitudinal lines on the hairy elytra. Main host plants include Callicarpa arborea, Callicarpa macrophylla, Premna pyramidata, Viburnum odoratissimum and Wrightia tinctoria.

Distribution
This widespread species can be found in Cambodia, China, India, Laos, Malaysia, Myanmar, Sri Lanka, Sumatra, Taiwan, Thailand and Vietnam.

References

 Worldwide Cerambycoidea Photo Gallery
 Biolib
 Creatures Big and Small
 Lamiaires du monde

Xylorhizini
Beetles of Asia